King of Bands is a compilation album from American hardcore punk and speed metal band, Gang Green.

It was released in December, 1991 on Roadrunner Records and contained two newly recorded tracks from two-fifths of the line up who had appeared on the previous album.

Josh Pappe had got married and was replaced by Kevin Brooks on bass. Fritz Ericson had retired and was replaced by Mike Lucantonio on guitar. Brian Betzger left to start a pool hall and was replaced in a touring capacity by Walter Gustafson – the drummer in the band who left in 1984. Gustafson left before this album and was replaced once again, by Brian Betzger.

The material is evenly gleaned from previous albums: three tracks from Another Wasted Night, two from You Got It, two from the EP I81B4U, and three from their last studio album, Older... Budweiser.

The album's opening and closing tracks were newly recorded by the new line-up in September, 1991. These two songs were the last new songs to be created by Doherty and Co until 1997, when an EP, Back & Gacked was swiftly followed by a new album, Another Case Of Brewtality and a re-issue of their pre-Another Wasted Night material, Preschool – all on their original independent label, Taang.

Track listing
All tracks written by Chris Doherty, except where noted.
"Thunder" – 3:05
"Alcohol" (Chuck Stilphen, Doherty) – 2:06
"We'll Give It To You" – 3:13
"Bartender" (Joe Gittleman, Doherty) – 3:18
"Ballad" (Fritz Ericson, Doherty) – 2:30
"Fuck In A" – 0:52
"Just One Bullet" (Doherty, Betzger) – 3:06
"Another Wasted Night" – 2:28
"Another Bomb" – 2:28
"Put Her On Top" – 3:43
"Church Of Fun" (Doherty, Betzger) – 3:12
"Rub It In Your Face" – 3:34

Personnel
 Chris Doherty – vocals, guitar – all tracks
 Chuck Stilphen – guitar – tracks 2, 6, and 8
 Fritz Ericson – guitar – tracks 3, 4, 5, 7, 9, 10, and 11
 Mike Lucantonio – guitar – tracks 1 and 12
 Glen Stilphen – bass – tracks 2, 6, and 8
 Joe Gittleman – bass – tracks 3, 4, 5, 7, 9, 10, and 11
 Kevin Brooks – bass – tracks 1 and 12
 Brian Betzger – drums – all tracks
 Recorded 1985 – September, 1991
 Produced by
 Ross Humphrey – tracks 1, 6, and 12
 Alec Peters – tracks 2 and 8
 Thom Moore – tracks 3 and 9
 Daniel Rey – tracks 4 and 10
 Tom Soares – tracks 5, 7, and 11

External links
Taang Records band page
Trouserpress entry for Gang Green
More info on Gang Green

1991 compilation albums
Gang Green albums